Kahu (also Romanized as Kāhū) is a village in Golmakan Rural District, Central Golbaharr District, Golbahar County, Razavi Khorasan Province, Iran. At the 2006 census, its population was 768, in 233 families.

References 

Populated places in Chenaran County